The 1934 Brisbane City Council election was held on 28 April 1934 to elect the Lord Mayor and councillors for each of the 20 wards of the City of Brisbane.

Results

References 

1934
1934 elections in Australia
1930s in Brisbane
April 1934 events